DARS may refer to:

 DARS (gene), a human gene
 DARS (radar) Deployable Air operations centre, Recognized air picture production centre, Sensor Fusion Post, a NATO mobile deployable Command & Control radar system
 DoD Architecture Registry System 
 Texas Department of Assistive and Rehabilitative Services, a state agency that works with Texans with disabilities and children with developmental delays
 Digital Audio Radio Service, any type of digital radio service including Satellite DARS used by Sirius XM Radio
 Digital Audio Reference Signal, an AES standard for synchronizing devices
 Motorway Company in the Republic of Slovenia (Slovene: Družba za avtoceste v Republiki Sloveniji, DARS)
 DARS caste living in District Tharparkar and Umerkot
 Dars, a brand of chocolate bars produced in Japan by Morinaga & Company
 DnaA-reactivating sequences (DARS)